Al-Ahvaz TV or AlAhvazTV, (Persian: شبکه الاهواز, Arabic: قناة الأهواز الفضائیة) is an Iranian satellite network in Arabic language (Khuzestani Arabic), belonging to Islamic Republic of Iran, who has been founded/launched in the city of Ahwaz by Seyyed Mohammad Ali Mousavi Jazayeri, the representative of Guardianship of the Islamic Jurist in Khuzestan province on 5 August 2013.

Peiman-AliNejad, the president of "Amir-al-Mo'menin university of Ahvaz" is the head of this television-channel, and Sakhrawi was the first/previous head; Asqar-Qeibi is the deputy-president of this TV channel. The programs of the AlAhvazTV are broadcast in Arabic language (and Khuzestani Arabic). The television channel is servicing beside other Iranian Arabic channels, among "Al-Alam" and Al-Kawthar, daily in 24 hours.

See also

 Media of Iran
 Al-Alam News Network
 Al-Kawthar TV
 Television in Iran
 Cinema of Iran
 Islamic Republic of Iran Broadcasting

References

External links

International broadcasters
24-hour television news channels in Iran
Arab mass media
Arabic-language television stations
Islamic Republic of Iran Broadcasting